The rifleman's assault weapon (RAW) was a close-support rocket-propelled grenade developed around 1977 and put into limited service by the United States Marine Corps in the 1990s. It was developed in response to a military requirement for a multi-purpose close support weapon. The RAW's rocket-propelled spherical munition was fired from an M16 rifle and was capable of blowing holes through masonry walls and disabling light armored vehicles.

The RAW's 1 kg high explosive squash head (HESH) warhead could penetrate 20 cm of reinforced concrete (creating a 36 cm-wide hole) and hit moving targets at a range of 300 meters.  The RAW was considered to be ideal for the conditions of urban warfare. Reconsideration by the U.S. military as to what kind of close support weapon they were seeking resulted in only limited procurement of the RAW, despite the weapon performing to specification and displaying a remarkably flat trajectory to a range of 300 meters. Brunswick Corporation also developed an antitank version of the RAW.  Brunswick later sold the design for the RAW to KDI Precision Products, Inc., which became part of L-3 Communications in 2001.

Notes

Rifle grenades